Rekha Rachel Thomas is a mathematician and operations researcher. She works as a professor of mathematics at the University of Washington, and was the Robert R. and Elaine F. Phelps Professor there from 2008 until 2012. Her research interests include mathematical optimization and computational algebra.

Thomas earned a PhD in operations research from Cornell University in 1994, supervised by Bernd Sturmfels; her dissertation concerned Gröbner bases and integer programming. Prior to joining the University of Washington in 2000, she did postdoctoral studies at Yale University and the Zuse Institute Berlin, and held a faculty position at Texas A&M University beginning in 1995.

Thomas is the author of the textbook Lectures in Geometric Combinatorics (Student Mathematical Library, 33, American Mathematical Society, 2006). She was a plenary speaker at the 21st International Symposium on Mathematical Programming in 2012.

In 2013 she became one of the inaugural fellows of the American Mathematical Society.

References

External links

Year of birth missing (living people)
Living people
20th-century American mathematicians
21st-century American mathematicians
American women mathematicians
Cornell University alumni
University of Texas at Austin faculty
University of Washington faculty
Fellows of the American Mathematical Society
20th-century women mathematicians
21st-century women mathematicians
Combinatorialists
Operations researchers
20th-century American women
21st-century American women